Stanisław Kuczborski (January 31, 1912 – August 23, 2004) was a Polish pulmonologist.

Kuczborski obtained his high school diploma in 1930, at the Mikołaj Kopernik Boys’ High School in Łódź. In 1930 he began his studies at the Medical Department of the Warsaw University. As a student, he contracted tuberculosis and was referred to Warsaw University's Sanatorium in Zakopane. This experience caused him to focus his medical studies. After he finished a one-year postgraduate internship in Warsaw hospitals, he worked in a sanatorium in Otwock, near Warsaw. There he expanded work in the field of internal medicine, particularly Physical medicine and rehabilitation (PM&R), or physiatry. He spent the years during the Nazi occupation in the sanatorium. After World War II, he returned to his home city of Łódź. In 1951, he received his PhD from the Medical University of Silesia.

As a physician, Kuczborski was a pulmonary and physiatric consultant. His career was mainly associated with Łódź; only after from 1952 to 1955, did he reside in Warsaw serving as the deputy director of the Tuberculosis Institute in Warsaw. Kuczborski held posts as director of several hospitals in Łódź. He also established a laboratory of physiopathology of breathing, the first in the Łódź region and one of the first in Poland. He also was the director of the Lung Disease Hospital in Łagiewniki until he retired in 1977.

He held foreign (Denmark, France) scientific internships mainly in the field of functional tests and rehabilitation of the respiratory system. He was an honorary member of the International Union against Tuberculosis and Lung Disease located in Paris. In Poland, he received an honorary membership of the Polish Physiatry and Pulmonology Association. Kuczborski published 70 works, mainly on tuberculosis (TB) chemotherapy, physiopathology of breathing, rehabilitation and intensive care of the respiratory system diseases.

References

University of Warsaw alumni
Polish pulmonologists
1912 births
2004 deaths
People in health professions from Łódź